Euglandina wani is a species of predatory, air-breathing, land snail, a terrestrial pulmonate gastropod mollusk in the family Spiraxidae. This species is endemic to Nicaragua.

References

Spiraxidae
Gastropods described in 1968
Endemic fauna of Nicaragua
Taxonomy articles created by Polbot
Taxobox binomials not recognized by IUCN